Athous balcanicus is a species of click beetle from the family Elateridae endemic to Bulgaria.

References

Beetles of Europe
Endemic fauna of Bulgaria
Beetles described in 1905
Dendrometrinae